Lee Jae-Myung (born July 25, 1991) is a South Korean football player who plays for Gyeongnam FC.

External links
 

1991 births
Living people
Association football defenders
South Korean footballers
Gyeongnam FC players
Jeonbuk Hyundai Motors players
Gimcheon Sangmu FC players
K League 1 players
Sportspeople from Daejeon